The Community Clubhouse is a historic building in West Hollywood, California, U.S. It has been listed on the National Register of Historic Places since July 23, 2013.

References

Buildings and structures on the National Register of Historic Places in California
Buildings and structures in West Hollywood, California
National Register of Historic Places in Los Angeles County, California